Basil Blackett may refer to:

 Basil Blackett (civil servant) (1882–1935), British civil servant and expert on international finance
 Basil Blackett (RAF officer) (1886–1920), British First World War flying ace